Cristian García may refer to:

 Cristian García (footballer, born 1974), Argentine footballer
 Cristian García (Peruvian footballer) (born 1981), Peruvian footballer
 Cristian García (Spanish footballer) (born 1981), Spanish footballer
 Cristian García (footballer, born 1988), Argentine footballer
 Cristian García (Colombian footballer) (born 1995), Colombian footballer
 Cristian García (footballer, born 1996), Argentine footballer

See also
 Christian Garcia (born 1985), American baseball player
 Christian García (footballer) (born 1999), Andorran footballer